Ability Group is a British property company based in Brentford founded in 1996 by hotelier and property tycoon Andreas Panayiotou.

Ability Group had 7,000 residential properties, worth over £1 billion, before moving into hotels and commercial property.

Ability Group owns Dunblane Hydro, Hilton Liverpool, Hilton Cambridge, Waldorf-Astoria Syon Park, DoubleTree Aberdeen.

The hotel in Aberdeen had a £7 million renovation by The Ability Group.

References

Companies based in the London Borough of Hounslow
Commercial real estate companies
British companies established in 1996
1996 establishments in the United Kingdom
Property companies of the United Kingdom